Awesomer is a 2005 album by Brooklyn-based indie rock band Blood on the Wall. Its music combines influences like My Bloody Valentine, Pixies, Sonic Youth and Pavement.

Track listing
"Stoner Jam" – 3:05
"Reunited On Ice" – 3:01
"Heat Of The Day" – 1:50
"I'd Like To Take You Out Tonight" – 3:37
"You're A Mess" – 2:12
"Keep Your Eyes" – 1:58
"Gone" – 1:31
"Mary Susan" – 2:54
"Hey, Hey" - 0:49
"Can You Hear Me" – 1:40
"Right To Lite Tonight" – 2:19
"Get The Fuck Off My Cloud" – 1:48
"Dead Edge Of Town" – 2:09
"Going To Heaven" – 3:01

References

2005 albums
Blood on the Wall albums
FatCat Records albums
The Social Registry albums